Laurelwood is a historic plantation house located in rural Richland County, South Carolina, near the city of Eastover. It was built about 1830, and is a two-story frame dwelling with a central-hall, double-pile plan. The front façade features a two-tier, three bay, pedimented portico in the Greek Revival style. It has a one-story, frame addition built in the early-20th century. Also on the property are the contributing frame smokehouse and a frame barn.  Also notable is the survival of a slave quarters.

It was added to the National Register of Historic Places in 1986.

See also
National Register of Historic Places listings in Richland County, South Carolina

References

External links
The Legacy of Laurelwood
Laurelwood at South Carolina Plantations

Plantation houses in South Carolina
Houses on the National Register of Historic Places in South Carolina
Greek Revival houses in South Carolina
Houses completed in 1830
Houses in Richland County, South Carolina
National Register of Historic Places in Columbia, South Carolina
1830 establishments in South Carolina
Slave cabins and quarters in the United States